Pinnacle is a rural town and locality in the Mackay Region, Queensland, Australia. In the  the locality of Pinnacle had a population of 214 people.

Geography
The locality is situated in the Pioneer Valley approximately 64 kilometres (39 mi) west of Mackay and close to the watersports and fishing area Teemburra Dam.

History 
In 1907, the Daily Mercury reported that a petition had been raised for a school to be established in the Pinnacle district. It was noted that the only available school was in Septimus which was difficult for children to access, particularly in poor weather. Pinnacle Provisional School opened on 4 June 1908. In 1908 it became Pinnacle State School.

Beatrice Creek State School opened on 2 November 1936 and closed on 30 April 1971.

In the  the locality of Pinnacle had a population of 214 people.

References

Mackay Region
Localities in Queensland